Chlorizeina unicolor is a species of grasshoppers in the subfamily Pyrgomorphinae found in Asia. It is the type species of its genus.

There are two subspecies:
 Chlorizeina unicolor roonwali Bhowmik, 1964
 Chlorizeina unicolor unicolor Brunner von Wattenwyl, 1893

The name Chlorizeina elegans Ramme. 1941 is a synonym for C. unicolor unicolor.

References

External links 

 Chlorizeina unicolor at orthoptera.speciesfile.org

Insects described in 1893
Pyrgomorphidae
Taxa named by Carl Brunner von Wattenwyl